The Sheffield Business Awards is an annual event, held in Sheffield to recognise and reward Sheffield City region business success.

Overview
The awards are organised by the Sheffield Star and the Sheffield Chamber of Commerce and Industry as the city region's premier showcase of enterprise.

Despite the name, the Sheffield Business Awards allows nominations for all businesses who are situated in the 'S' postcode area. This allows businesses in some areas of Rotherham, Barnsley and Doncaster to take part in the event.

Businesses can nominate themselves or be nominated for one or more of several categories which are then judged by a panel of independent business leaders, Sheffield Chamber of Commerce representatives and representatives from the sponsoring organisations. The Outstanding Business of the Year Award is decided from all short-listed companies excluding Business Person of the Year and Young Business Person of the Year.

The Ceremony
Each year a ceremony is held around the first week of December at Ponds Forge International Sports Centre. The event usually comprises a three course meal where several awards are presented between each course, culminating in the final award presented to the 'Outstanding Business of the Year'.

The 2018 ceremony was hosted by BBC Breakfast’s Dan Walker (broadcaster).

The 2012 ceremony was hosted by Paul Zenon with local magician Steve Faulkner.

The 2011 ceremony was again hosted by comedian and impressionist Jon Culshaw, back by popular demand.

The 2010 ceremony was hosted by comedian and impressionist Jon Culshaw.  The event was planned for 2 December, but unfortunately due to severe weather conditions, the awards were postponed until 13 January 2011.

The 2009 ceremony was hosted by Paul Ross on 3 December.

The 2008 ceremony was hosted by Jon Culshaw and held on 4 December 2008.

Award Categories & 2018 Winners
Outstanding Business of the Year:Twinkl Educational Publishing
Best Contribution to Sheffield Visitor Experience:Sheffield Theatres
Business Person of the Year, sponsored by Shorts Chartered Accountants, Winner: David Capper – Westfield HealthEmployer of the Year, sponsored by The Sheffield College: Twinkl Educational PublishingExcellence in Corporate, Social and Environmental Responsibility:Sheffield Sustainable KitchensExcellence in International Trade: Twinkl Educational PublishingExcellence in Manufacturing: MGB PlasticsExcellence in Professional Services:Shorts Chartered AccountantsHigh Growth Business of the Year: LabLogic Group Holdings LtdLarge Business of the Year:Bluetree GroupSME of the Year:Fernite of Sheffield LtdSpecial Recognition Award:Gordon BridgeThe Innovation Award:SleepCogniThe Marketing and Communications Award: VOW Europe Ltd.The Sheffield Universities Entrepreneurship Award:Tutorful

Award Categories & 2013 WinnersYoung Business Person of the Year Award: Oliver Bryssau (Origin Broadband)

Award Categories & 2010 WinnersThe Sheffield Chamber of Commerce & Industry Outstanding Business of the Year:George Robson & Co (Conveyors) LimitedThe Sheffield Enterprise Agency Enterprise Award:Future Life Wealth ManagementThe HSBC Excellence in International Trade Award:Hydra MiningThe Sheffield City Council Young Business Person of the Year Award:Tristan Cowell, IC InnovationsThe Digital Region Broadband Creative & Digital Industries Innovation:Zoo DigitalThe SYGBC Environmental Impact Award:Office Friendly Dealer Association LimitedThe Napoleons Casino & Restaurant, Ecclesall Road Excellence in Retail Services Award:The Girl with the Golden CupThe Pinder Bros Ltd Sheffield Champion Award:Thetford LtdThe Kier Sheffield Community Impact Award:Bag It Don’t Bin ItThe Kennedy’s Business Person of the Year Award:Kevin Mannion of Geo Robson & Co (Conveyors) LtdThe Wake Smith Excellence in Manufacturing Award:Geo Robson & Co (Conveyors)The Irwin Mitchell Excellence in Customer Service Award:George Robson & Co (Conveyors) LimitedThe Business Advantage Excellence in Skills Award:Barlow GroupThe NHS Sheffield Healthy Business Award:Sheffield International Venues LtdThe Sports & Leisure Business Forum Excellence in Sports Services Award:Sheffield International Venues

Award Categories & 2009 WinnersThe Amey Environmental Impact Award: Office Friendly Dealer AssociationThe ask4 Excellence in Retail Services Award: Kitlocker.comThe BiG Business Enterprise Award: AG Wind PowerThe Business Link Yorkshire Creative & Digital Industries Innovation Award: ZOO Digital Group plcThe Creative Sheffield, Sheffield Champion Award: DavyMarkham LtdThe Freeman College Community Impact Award: The United InitiativeThe Irwin Mitchell Excellence in Customer Service Award: Sheffield International VenuesThe NHS Sheffield Healthy Business Award: Specsavers Opticians @ Crystal PeaksThe City Strategy Excellence in Skills Award: Insight Direct UKThe UK Trade & Investment Excellence in International Trade Award: MTL Group LtdThe Wake Smith Excellence in Manufacturing Award: MTL Group LtdThe Williams Fasteners Excellence in Sports Services Award: Sheffield United PLCThe Sheffield Hallam University Young Business Person of the Year Award: Andrew Seaton from Resolve IT Solutions LtdThe Rensburg Sheppards Business Person of the Year Award: Kevin Parkin of DavyMarkham LtdThe Barclays Commercial Bank Outstanding Business of the Year Award: DavyMarkham Ltd

Award Categories & 2008 Winners
The 2008 ceremony saw an updated structure to the award categories. Each category was sponsored by an independent business or organisation and names of the awards were changed, with the addition of several extra categories and extra emphasis given to the main award for 'Outstanding Business of the Year'. The categories and winners of the 2008 awards were:Outstanding Business of The Year: MyJobGroup LtdThe "Sheffield Champion" Award: Sheffield International Documentary Festival LtdThe Creative & Digital Industries Innovation Award: MyJobGroup LtdThe Excellence in International Trade Award: DavyMarkham LimitedThe Excellence in Skills Award: Williams Brothers (Sheffield) LtdThe Excellence in Customer Service Award: Acorn Industrial Services LtdThe Community Impact Award: Kier SheffieldThe Excellence in Retail Services Award: Ferndale Garden CentreThe Business Person of the Year Award: Freeman College's David HeughThe Manufacturing Award: DavyMarkham LimitedThe Enterprise Award: Ecotek UK LtdThe Environmental award: VeryPCThe Young Business Person of the Year Award''': Ladyzone's Jamie Cartwright

References

External links
 Official Website

Economy of Sheffield